Manna Full Gospel Churches is a Christian denomination in India. It was founded in 1966.
It belongs to Manna Group of Ministries. The Presiding Bishop of the Manna Full Gospel Churches is Bishop Ernest Komanapalli. Its membership exceeds 100,000.

References 

Pentecostalism in India
Christian organizations established in 1968
Pentecostal denominations
1968 establishments in India